Swigart's Mill, also known as Beaver Creek Mill, is a historic grist mill located at Paradise Township, York County, Pennsylvania.  It was built in 1794, and is a 2 1/2-story, stone building measuring 45 feet, 6 inches, by 40 feet, 8 inches.  It is three bays by three bays and has a gable roof.  The mill operated until about 1920.

Just across Beaver Creek to the west is the town of East Berlin, Pennsylvania and the East Berlin Historic District, which are in Adams County. 
The mill was added to the National Register of Historic Places in 1980.

References

Grinding mills on the National Register of Historic Places in Pennsylvania
Industrial buildings completed in 1794
Buildings and structures in York County, Pennsylvania
Grinding mills in Pennsylvania
Articles containing video clips
National Register of Historic Places in York County, Pennsylvania
1794 establishments in Pennsylvania